Kulash Nogataiqyzy Shamshidinova (Küläş Noğataiqyzy Şämşidinova; born 4 March 1958) is a Kazakh politician who served as a Minister of Education and Science from 25 February to 13 June 2019.

Biography

Early life and education 
Shamshidinova was born in the village of Besqaynar in now Almaty Region. In 1979, she graduated from the Faculty of Chemistry of the Al-Farabi Kazakh National University.

Career 
After graduating, Shamshidinova became a High School chemistry teacher. From 1981 to 1987, she served as a Secretary of the Kirovsky District Committee, First Secretary of the Guards District Committee, Secretary of the Taldy-Kurgan Regional Committee of the LKSMK. In 1987, Shamshidinova became an instructor of the Taldy-Kurgan Regional Party Committee. From 1988 until 1991, she was a Secretary of the Taldy-Kurgan City Party Committee. In 1991, Shamshidinova became the deputy director of the Taldy-Kurgan Regional Institute for Teacher Training and in 1992, as a director of Secondary School No. 18. 

From 1996 to 2002, she served as a deputy äkim of Taldıqorğan. In February 2002, Shamshidinova was appointed as a Vice Minister of Education and Science. She served that position until becoming a  General Director of the Bobek National Scientific and Practical Educational and Health Center on 23 May 2005. She was again appointed as Vice Minister of Education and Science in April 2007. From October 2009 to February 2019, Shamshidinova served as a chair of the Board of JSC Nazarbayev Intellectual Schools. 

On 25 February 2019, after the government was resigned, Shamshidinova was appointed as the Minister of Education and Science. She served the post until being dismissed on 13 June 2019 and being replaced by Ashat Aimagambetov.

References 

1958 births
Living people
People from Almaty Region
Nur Otan politicians
Government ministers of Kazakhstan